The Blackrock–St Finbarr's rivalry is a hurling rivalry between Cork city club teams Blackrock and St Finbarr's. It is considered to be one of the biggest rivalries in Cork hurling.

Regarded as two of Cork club hurling's "big three", with Glen Rovers making up the trio, a county final between "the Rockies" and "the Barrs" is historically regarded as a special occasion.

History

Formation

Formed as St Finbarr's National Hurling & Football Club in Togher in 1876, the club had been active and competitive in the years before the establishment of the Gaelic Athletic Association in 1884. They entered a team in the inaugural Cork County Championship in 1887 and claimed their first title in 1899. 

Formed as Cork Nationals in Blackrock in 1883, the club predates the foundation of the Gaelic Athletic Association by one year. They entered a team in the inaugural Cork County Championship in 1887, eventually being declared champions without having to play the final. They quickly established themselves as one of the preeminent teams, not only in Cork but in the country, and claimed ten championships in 21 years. Both St. Finbarr's and Blackrock are the only two teams that have never been relegated or faced regrading from senior level.

Honours, results and records

Honours

Recent results

References

St Finbarr's Rivalry
Cork Senior Hurling Championship
St Finbarr's National Hurling & Football Club